The Stoutenburgh House is a historic house located at 255 S. Marengo Ave. in Pasadena, California. Built in 1893, the house was designed by Los Angeles architect J. H. Bradbeer in the Queen Anne style. The house's design features a roof with many gables, multiple porches with turned columns and brackets carved by bandsaws, and patterned shingle siding. An original carriage house and barn are also located on the property. John and Mary Stoutenburgh, a prominent local couple, lived in the house; John died in 1904, but Mary occupied the house into the 1920s.

The house was added to the National Register of Historic Places on November 25, 1980.

References

Houses on the National Register of Historic Places in California
Buildings and structures on the National Register of Historic Places in Pasadena, California
Queen Anne architecture in California
Houses completed in 1893
Houses in Pasadena, California
1893 establishments in California